The North Carolina General Assembly of 1778 met in three sessions in three locations in the years 1778 and 1779. The first session was held in New Bern from April 14 to May 2, 1778; the second session in Hillsborough, from August 8 to August 19, 1778; the third and final session in Halifax, from January 19 to February 13, 1779.

Each of the 39 North Carolina counties and Washington District/County were authorized by the North Carolina Constitution of 1776 to elect one Senator to the Senate and two representatives to the House of Commons.  In addition, six districts (also called boroughs) were authorized to elect one House representative each.  Richard Caswell was elected governor by the legislature.

Legislation
This general assembly established Wilkes County in 1778  This general assembly established the following counties in  their last session in 1779:  Franklin, Gates, Jones, Lincoln, Montgomery, Randolph, Richmond, Rutherford, Warren, and Wayne Counties.   For additional laws and minutes of the 1778 General Assembly, see Legislative Documents.

Councilors of State
The General Assembly elected the following Councilors of State on April 18, 1778:
 Joseph Leech, from Craven County 
 Thomas Bonner from Beaufort County
 William Cray from Onslow County
 Edward Starkey from Onslow County
 Robert Bignall from Edgecombe County
 Richard Henderson from Granville County
 William Haywood from Edgecombe County
 William Bryan from Craven County 
 John Simpson from Pitt County
 Frederick Jones from New Hanover County (elected on February 3, 1779)

House of Commons

House leadership
 Speaker: John Williams (Granville County), until April 28, 1778; Thomas Benbury (Chowan County) elected to replace Williams.
 Clerk: John Hunt (Franklin County)
 Assistant Clerk: Joseph Blithe

House members

The members of the House and the counties and districts they represented are listed below.

Senate

Senate leadership
 President pro tempore: Whitmell Hill, until his election to the Continental Congress; Allen Jones elected to replace Hill
 Clerk: John Sitgreaves

Senate members

The following senators and the counties they represented are listed.

Notes:

References

1778
General Assembly
General Assembly
 1778
 1778